Ogrodziński is a Polish surname and may refer to:

 Przemysław Ogrodziński (1918–1980), Polish diplomat
 Piotr Ogrodziński (1951-), Polish diplomat.
 Władysław Ogrodziński (1918–2012), Polish historian

Polish-language surnames